The Demarest Building at 339 Fifth Avenue in Midtown Manhattan, New York City was designed by Renwick, Aspinwall & Russell and constructed for coachbuilder Aaron T. Demarest. An 1893 fire destroyed property in the building, which was later used for other purposes. 


Description 

The Demarest Building is on the northeast corner of Fifth Avenue and 33rd Street in Midtown Manhattan, just east of the Empire State Building. The building has been compared to Carnegie Hall.

History 

A July 26, 1893 fire destroyed property at the building. The building was later converted to other uses.

By 2015, developer Pi Capital Partners planned to replace the building and neighboring structures with a new residential tower. In 2019, Pi Capital filed plans for a 26-story mixed-use development on the site of the Demarest Building, with 82 apartments. This prompted preservationists and groups, including the Greenwich Village Society for Historic Preservation, to petition the New York City Landmarks Preservation Commission (LPC) to designate the building as an official city landmark, thereby protecting it from demolition. The LPC expressed concern that the building's exterior had been altered too frequently throughout its history and the old building was not saved. , it is being replaced by a 21-story, 82-unit mixed-use building with commercial space at the base and up to five residential units on each floor.

References

Sources 

1890 establishments in New York (state)
Beaux-Arts architecture in New York City
Fifth Avenue
Midtown Manhattan